Prithviraj Meena (born 1 July 1958) is a member of the Rajasthan Legislative Assembly from Todabhim constituency.

References 

Indian National Congress politicians from Rajasthan
Rajasthan MLAs 2018–2023
Living people
1958 births